Stephen Mulvey (3 March 1878 – 19 October 1954) was an Irish Gaelic footballer and revolutionary. His championship career at senior level for the Dublin county team lasted one season.

Mulvey first played competitive Gaelic football with the Bray Emmets club. He won his sole county senior championship medal in 1901.

Mulvey made his debut on the inter-county scene as a member of the Dublin senior team during the 1902 championship. His one season with the team culminated with the winning of an All-Ireland medal, having earlier won a Leinster medal.

As the political situation in Ireland became more militant, Mulvey joined the Irish Volunteers shortly after their establishment in 1913. During the 1916 Easter Rising he walked from his home in Bray to Dublin city centre to take part in the insurrection.

Honours
Bray Emmets
Dublin Senior Football Championship (1): 1901

Dublin
All-Ireland Senior Football Championship (1): 1902
Leinster Senior Football Championship (1): 1902

References

1878 births
1954 deaths
Dublin inter-county Gaelic footballers